The String Quintet No. 1 in A minor, Op. 1 (B. 7), is a string quintet by Antonín Dvořák, scored for two violins, two violas and cello. Composed in 1861, it is the first piece to which he assigned an opus number and the work with which he, at age 20, launched his career as a composer. It was not premiered until 1921, 17 years after his death, and first published in 1943.

Structure 
The composition consists of three movements:

A typical performance takes approximately 28 minutes.

References

External links 
 

1861 compositions
Compositions in A minor
String quintets by Antonín Dvořák